Future Reconstructions - Ritual Of The Solstice is a 1996 album featuring remixes of Hawkwind tracks.

Track listing

CD
"Sonic Attack" – Knights Of The Occasional Table – 6:55
"Forge of Vulcan" – Optic Eye – 5:26
"Master of the Universe" – Salt Tank – 6:09
"Spirit of the Age (Flesh to Phantasy)" – Astralasia – 9:56
"You Shouldn't Do That" – Translucent – 4:59
"Sonic Destruction" – The Advent – 6:35
"Damnation Alley" – Zion Train – 7:15
"Uncle Sams on Mars" – Astralasia –  6:32
"Silver Machine" – Utah Saints – 7:13
"Needle Gun" – Doctor Jest (Haggis Of Sensor) – 3:57

vinyl
"Sonic Destruction" – The Advent
"You Shouldn't Do That" – Translucent
"Master Of The Universe" – Salt Tank
"Forge Of Vulcan" – Optic Eye
"Assassin" – Astralasia
"Damnation Alley" – Zion Train
"Silver Machine" – Utah Saints
"Sonic Attack" – The Knights Of The Occasional Table

Release history
1996: CD and 2x12", Emergency Broadcast System Records, EBS117

References

Hawkwind albums
1996 remix albums